Saint Francis in Meditation (c. 1604/06 or 1607/10), is a painting by the Italian master Caravaggio, in the Museo Civico, Cremona.

This is one of two paintings of almost identical measurements showing Saint Francis of Assisi contemplating a skull (see Saint Francis in Prayer) - neither is documented and both are disputed, although the dispute is as to whether they are originals or copies. The dating of both is highly uncertain, although the cypress trunk behind this Saint Francis is very reminiscent of the tree behind the Corsini John the Baptist.

Background
St Francis was a popular subject during the Counter-Reformation, when the Church stressed - at least officially - the virtues of poverty and the imitation of Christ.

See also
List of paintings by Caravaggio

References

External links
Painters of reality: the legacy of Leonardo and Caravaggio in Lombardy, an exhibition catalog from The Metropolitan Museum of Art (fully available online as PDF), which contains material on this painting (see index)

1600s paintings
Paintings by Caravaggio
Religious paintings
Paintings of Francis of Assisi
Books in art
Skulls in art